Sphaerium beckmani is an extinct species of fossil freshwater pea clams from the Late Cretaceous deposits of North America. This species was first described by the American paleontologist Loris Shano Russell in 1976. The specimens were collected by the American paleontologist Karl M. Waage from 1961 to 1962 from the Hell Creek Formation of eastern Montana. The locality is dated to the late Maastrichtian Age (around 66.0 to 72.1 million years ago).

Since the Sphaerium beckmani had a hard shell as it was a pea clam it was used for the protection of themselves from predators and severe conditions which is what the Phylum Mollusca means.

References

beckmani
Cretaceous bivalves
Late Cretaceous animals of North America
Cretaceous United States
Maastrichtian life
Hell Creek fauna
Fossil taxa described in 1976